Tim Waterson is a Canadian drummer who holds the world record for the fastest number of double strokes on a bass drum using a double pedal, with a record of 1,407 in one minute (January 22, 2002).

Career
Waterson started an organization to promote speed drumming as a sport. In 2006 he performed 1,075 single-stroke rolls on a bass drum in 60 seconds. 

In 2007 Waterson released a two-DVD set, Techniques, Motions and Applications for Bass Drum Playing.

Waterson uses the heel-toe technique and also invented the pump technique for fast single strokes.  His use of the Vruk heel pedal system enables him to perform a modified version of heel-toe playing. Tim is profiled in the book Believe the Unbelievable by Bartley Press.

References

External links
 Interview on YouTube

Year of birth missing (living people)
Living people
Place of birth missing (living people)
Canadian drummers
Canadian male drummers